Tracy Richardson (born January 21, 1965) is a member of the Ohio House of Representatives representing the 86th district since 2019.  A Republican, Richardson's district includes Union County and the majority of Marion County. A graduate of the United States Military Academy, Richardson served in Operation Desert Shield where she earned a Bronze Star. She currently serves in the Army National Guard. Prior to elected office, Richardson served as a human resources officer for a number of different companies. She also served on the Marysville City Council for nearly nine years.

In 2019, state Representative Dorothy Liggett Pelanda opted not to seek reelection to her state House seat, and Richardson easily won the Republican primary to succeed her. She went on to win the general election with nearly 70% of the vote.

In 2019, Richardson co-sponsored legislation that would ban abortion in Ohio and criminalize what they called "abortion murder". Doctors who performed abortions in cases of ectopic pregnancy and other life-threatening conditions would be exempt from prosecution only if they "[took] all possible steps to preserve the life of the unborn child, while preserving the life of the woman. Such steps include, if applicable, attempting to reimplant an ectopic pregnancy into the woman's uterus". Reimplantation of an ectopic pregnancy is not a recognized or medically feasible procedure.

References

Links 

 Representative Tracy Richardson (official site)

1965 births
Living people
Republican Party members of the Ohio House of Representatives
Women state legislators in Ohio
21st-century American politicians
21st-century American women politicians
Ohio city council members
Women city councillors in Ohio
People from Marysville, Ohio
United States Military Academy alumni